Thymopsis is a genus of flowering plants in the bahia tribe within the daisy family.

 Species
 Thymopsis brittonii Greenm. - Bahamas
 Thymopsis thymoides (Griseb.) Urb. - Cuba

References

Bahieae
Asteraceae genera
Flora of the Caribbean